Harrison Township is one of seventeen townships in Adair County, Iowa, USA.  As of the 2020 census, its population was 178.

History
Harrison Township was organized in 1856.
It was served by the Arbor Hill post office from 1857 to 1907.

Geography
According to the USGS, it contains two cemeteries: Fairview and Roberts.

References

External links
 US-Counties.com
 City-Data.com

Townships in Adair County, Iowa
Townships in Iowa
1856 establishments in Iowa
Populated places established in 1856